The International Records Management Trust was a United Kingdom-based charity, established in 1989 by Dr Anne Thurston, OBE, to develop new strategies for managing records and information. It closed in 2019.
Its aim was to provide consultancy services, training and education and research into records management across the world. 
Its work emphasised the importance of managing records as a basis for protecting civil and human rights, reducing poverty, controlling corruption, strengthening democracy, promoting economic and social reform, improving services to citizens, and demonstrating accountability and transparency.

The IRMT was based in London and governed by a board of trustees. Its work was supported by a team of over 60 practicing professionals drawn from the public and private sectors and from academic institutions worldwide.

Research 
The IRMT's research and deve
lopment programme focused on the transition to managing records and information in the electronic working environment. The research findings  are available internationally through the IRMT website and are used as the basis for developing education and training programmes. The Trust also worked in applying them practically.  The most recent research addressed is 'Fostering Trust and Transparency in Governance: Investigating and Addressing the Requirements for Building Integrity in Public Sector Information Systems in the ICT Environment.'

Consultancy Services 
The IRMT worked with local policy makers, stakeholders and records professionals to develop and implement and sustainable legal and regulatory records and information management frameworks, policies, systems, procedures and facilities, in the paper or the electronic environments, either at the central or local level or in relation to particular functions.  It focused particularly on records projects that affect citizens' rights, entitlements and welfare, for instance projects that contribute to accountability and anti-corruption measures, by strengthening records relating to the management of land, finance, human resources, or the judicial process.  Projects have been delivered  successfully in over 30 countries, including, for instance, Bangladesh, Sierra Leone and Belize.

Training and Education 
The two major IRMT initiatives in this area are The Management of Public Sector Records Study (MPSR) programme and the Training in Electronic Records Management (TERM) programme. These were prepared with the aim of supporting countries where professional educational tools in the field of records and information management are hard to obtain. All such material is made available internationally, free of charge in hard copy and through the IRMT website.

Fundraising and Partnerships
The Trust was funded mainly through national and international development agencies, including the U.S., Canadian and U.K., the World Bank and the UNDP. Professional partners include the International Council on Archives and ARMA International.

See also
Records Management
Transparent government

References

External links
The International Records Management Trust

Organizations established in 1989
Charities based in England
Information technology management